Warren Anthony Wisneski (born 19 February 1969) is a former New Zealand cricketer who played three One Day Internationals in 2000.

An uncompromising "into the wind" opening or first-change bowler, and useful lower-order batsman, Wisneski played first-class cricket for Central Districts from 1992 to 1996, and for Canterbury from 1996 to 2004. His best first-class bowling figures were 7 for 151 for Canterbury against Auckland in 2000–01. In the Shell Trophy final in 1997–98, he scored 89 not out, setting a new record for a number 11 batsman in New Zealand first-class cricket; he and Lee Germon added 160 for the tenth wicket in 143 minutes.

He also played for Taranaki in the Hawke Cup. He retired from all cricket in 2004.

He was an important member of the relief teams in Christchurch immediately after the 2010 and 2011 Christchurch earthquakes.

References

External links
 

1969 births
Living people
New Zealand cricketers
New Zealand One Day International cricketers
Canterbury cricketers
Central Districts cricketers
South Island cricketers